Wizja Info was a Polish television station launched on July 25, 2001. The channel was available on the TV platform Wizja TV. The channel presented information about Wizja TV program's offer and information on subscriber contests, short overviews of the most interesting programming items and a list of the most important phone and contact details for customers.

Wizja Info ended broadcasting in 2002 after the merger of Wizja TV and Cyfra+.

References

External links

Defunct television channels in Poland
Television channels and stations established in 2001
Television channels and stations disestablished in 2002
2001 establishments in Poland
2002 disestablishments in Poland
Polish-language television stations
Mass media in Warsaw